Dickinson High School is a public high school located in Dickinson, North Dakota. It currently serves about 1,060 students and is a part of the Dickinson Public Schools system. The official school colors are orange and black and the athletic teams are known as the Midgets.

DHS educates an average of 1,000 students in grades nine through twelve each year, and employs 60 certified teachers and 35 classified staff members. DHS offers 328 different courses in a variety of subjects, as well as Advanced Placement courses and college dual-credit courses.

History

In 1909 the community built Central High School, a two-story structure of 12 classrooms.  The first floor contained the library and assembly hall, and the basement served as the gym.  Central High possessed the latest in technological marvels when electric lights were installed in 1910. The school stood on the southwest corner of the school block where P.S. Berg Elementary stands today.

By the mid-1930s Dickinson's schools suffered from overcrowding. The school board felt it was time to build a new high school, but, despite information presented to the public, the city voted against the $100,000 bond issue necessary for construction.  However, the school board applied for assistance from the Public Works Administration to build the high school and adjoining athletic field.  Additions were made to this new Central High School in 1950. Central High School became increasingly more crowded and as the Model High at Dickinson State College closed in 1963, the need for a new high school was evident.  The State Department of Vocational Education agreed to help with construction.

In March 1966, voters approved the $1,525,000 bond issue for construction. The new high school, Dickinson High School, was designated as one of the two area vocational high schools in North Dakota.  Several outbuildings and a new auditorium were added over the years.

The 1981–1982 school year saw the largest student enrollment in the district's history, with 1,041 students in the high school. The former Central High became A.L. Hagen Junior High in 1968, when the new Dickinson High School was built on Empire Road north of town.

In 1994, Dickinson adopted the block scheduling system, in which students attend only four courses a day, each 90 minutes long, enabling them to earn more class credits than in other schools (which traditionally mandate seven courses per day). They have recently added the "opportunity period," which allows a 30-minute period for lunch. In this time the students can work on homework, tests, or whatever the teacher assigns. This takes place three days a week and freshmen are required to attend. If the other classes do not need the extra help, they get an extended lunch.

Activities and athletics

Championships
State Class 'A' speech: 2016
State Class 'AAA' football: 1997
State Class 'A' volleyball: 2005, 2006
State Class 'A' boys basketball: 2003, 2007
State Class 'A' baseball: 2001, 2004, 2007, 2009, 2016
State Class 'A' boys' track and field: 1941, 1959, 1960, 1962, 1981, 1982, 1989, 1990, 1997, 1998, 1999
State Class 'A' girls' track and field: 1975, 1976, 1977, 1980, 1990
State Class 'A' boys' cross country: 1986, 2000
State Class 'A' girls' cross country: 2000, 2001, 2002, 2003, 2004
State gymnastics: 1974, 1975, 1976, 1987, 1988, 2007, 2008, 2013, 2014, 2016, 2017, 2018, 2019, 2020, 2021, 2022
State Class 'A' dance team
Jazz: 2009
Hip Hop: 2009
State Science Bowl: 2008, 2009
State Girls Softball: 2021

Mascot controversy
There has been controversy surrounding Dickinson's mascot, the Midget.  In the mid-1990s the school became concerned that their 80-year-old mascot was not politically correct and communicated that they were considering a change. In 1996, the school board voted to change the mascot. Residents of Dickinson were angry at the decision and recalled at least three of the board members. A South Dakota school changed its nickname from "Midget" to Mustangs" by request of the Little People of America, but Dickinson refused a change. In 2010, the school board's president, Dean Rummel, brought up the issue again, but the board decided not to address it. In 2019, the Little People of America came to Dickinson to request again that the school consider changing the mascot. The school board directed the school district administration to collect feedback from the community about the change. A resulting survey found that 35% of the community supported the change, while 65% opposed it. , the name has not been changed, with the mascot still visible on the school website. According to the Little People of America, as of July 2021, Dickinson was one of five schools in the United States still using a midget mascot.

Notable alumni and staff
Mitch Malloy (born 1961), singer, songwriter, and producer mix and mastering engineer
Kelly Armstrong (born 1976),  U.S. Representative for North Dakota's at-large congressional district
Lucas Sandman (born 1982),  Doctor of Dentistry, and North Dakota Baseball Legend (Player and Coach)
Cole Frenzel (born 1990), North Dakota Baseball Legend, former Arizona Wildcats and Major League Baseball player, current professional outdoor enthusiast

References

External links

Dickinson High School website
Dickinson High School Alumni website

Public high schools in North Dakota
Educational institutions established in 1909
Schools in Stark County, North Dakota
North Dakota High School Activities Association (Class A)
North Dakota High School Activities Association (Class AAA Football)
Dickinson, North Dakota
1909 establishments in North Dakota